Leachim was an early example of Diphone synthetic speech and demonstrated how voice branching could be done quickly via computer discs to create understandable speech (i.e. verbal output). This method combined phonemes, words, and sentences to form verbal responsive messages when prompted by the computer. The device received attention on a world-wide basis because hundreds of articles were written about it.

History 
The device was developed by Michael J. Freeman and installed in robot form in a New York City School in a Fourth grade class, as a teacher's assistant. The computer had biographical information of those students whom it was programmed to teach in addition to curriculum data.  Leachim could teach a number of students simultaneously through the use of headsets.

Hardware 
The computer part of the robot was built from RCA Spectra 70 series of computers. Leachim could simultaneously interact with multiple students and keep track of their progress individually. Its body was made of wood and there were internal mechanics so parts such as the arms and head could move.

Robbery 
On June 12, 1975, Leachim was stolen while being trucked back to NY from a 1-hour appearance on the Phil Donahue Show and despite an FBI investigation and a reward from Lloyd's of London, it was not recovered.

Leachim was built by Michael J. Freeman Ph.D. and after it was stolen he built another more advanced version.

2-XL 
Leachim remained active for 3 years from 1972 to 1975. Later a toy inspired version of Leachim called "2-XL Robot" was introduced. The toy was mass produced in many countries by Mego Corporation in the 1980s and later by Tiger Electronics in the 1990s.

References 

Robots
Robotics
Speech processing software